Munaily District is a district of Mangystau Region in south-western Kazakhstan. The administrative center of the district is selo of Mangistau.

Population

References

Districts of Kazakhstan
Mangystau Region